Thiophaeococcus mangrovi is a Gram-negative bacterium from the genus of Thiophaeococcus which has been isolated from mud from the Bhitarkanika mangrove forest from Orissa in India.

References 

Chromatiales
Bacteria described in 2008